Abagnale is an Italian surname. Notable people with the surname include:

 Alessandro Abagnale (born 1998), Italian footballer
 Frank Abagnale (born 1948), American security consultant
 Giovanni Abagnale (born 1995), Italian rower

See also
 Abbagnale

Italian-language surnames